Ernesto Velázquez Ruiz-Mateos (born 3 October 1988) is a Spanish badminton player. He won the bronze medal at the 2007 European Junior Championships in the boys' singles event. He emerged as the mixed doubles champion at the National Championships in 2011–2013. He retired from the international competition in November 2017.

Achievements

European Junior Championships 
Boys' singles

BWF International Challenge/Series 
Men's singles

  BWF International Challenge tournament
  BWF International Series tournament
  BWF Future Series tournament

References

External links 
 

1988 births
Living people
Spanish male badminton players
Competitors at the 2013 Mediterranean Games
Mediterranean Games competitors for Spain